NHL 95 (also known as NHL Hockey 95) is an ice hockey video game developed by Electronic Arts Canada. It was released in 1994 for the Super Nintendo Entertainment System and the Sega Genesis. The team rosters and player attributes in the game reflect that of the 1994–95 season.

Reception

GamePro gave the Genesis version a perfect score and called it "the smoothest, most entertaining hockey title ever created", citing the ability to sign, trade, and release real NHL players, the ability to create one's own fantasy players, the advanced statistics tracking, the new injury animations, the realistic sounds, and "the unbelievably blazing speed of the game". They declared the SNES version to be "just average" due to the vastly inferior controls and sound effects as compared to the Genesis version, as well as the removal of content such as shootout mode, playoff mode, fake shots, and drop-passes. They were still less enthusiastic about the Game Boy version, saying that its impressive graphics and selection of modes are outweighed by the frustration generated by the limited two-button control. They also commented, "The sprites are large and detailed, but that creates another problem. The bigger the players, the less ice that fits on the tiny screen, so you almost need a map to find the net."

Next Generation reviewed the PC version of the game, rating it four stars out of five, and stated that "A must for any serious hockey fan."

Next Generation reviewed the Genesis version of the game, rating it four stars out of five, and stated that "EA shoots and scores again with the best NHL action anywhere, and possibly the only NHL action anywhere."

In 1995, Total! ranked the game 32nd on their Top 100 SNES Games. In the same year, Flux magazine rated the Sega Genesis version 9th in its Top 100 Video Games.  They lauded the game writing: "NHL '95 is not only the epitome of hockey carts, but also one of the most brilliantly engaging sports contests in gaming history."

References

External links 

 

1994 video games
DOS games
EA Sports games
Electronic Arts games
Game Boy games
Game Gear games
High Score Productions games
Malibu Interactive games
Multiplayer and single-player video games
NHL (video game series)
Sega Genesis games
Super Nintendo Entertainment System games
Video games developed in Canada
Video games scored by Rob Hubbard
Video games scored by Russell Lieblich
Video games set in 1994
Video games set in 1995
Video games set in Canada
Video games set in the United States